Abortion in Colorado is legal at all stages of pregnancy. It is one of six states without any term restrictions as to when a pregnancy can be terminated. 

Outpatient abortion is available up to 26 weeks. In addition, medically indicated termination of pregnancy up to 34 weeks is also an option for conditions such as fetal anomalies, genetic disorder, fetal demise and/or severe medical problems. 

59% of adults said in a poll  by the Pew Research Center that abortion should be legal and 36% saying it should be illegal in all or most cases. In 1962, the American Law Institute published their model penal code as it applied to abortions with three circumstances where they believed a physician could justifiably perform an abortion. A version of this was enacted into law in 1967. Colorado became the first state to decriminalize abortion in cases of rape, incest, or in which pregnancy would lead to permanent physical disability of the woman. The Colorado Amendment 48 initiative was proposed in 2008 jointly by Kristine Burton and Michael Burton of Colorado for Equal Rights. Colorado Right to Life supported the amendment. This abortion restriction law did not pass because it met strong opposition. In 2013, 2014, 2015, 2016, 2017, and 2018, the state legislature had attempts to ban abortion that all failed.

The number of abortion clinics in the state have been declining for years, going from 73 in 1982 to 59 in 1992 to 21 in 2014. The slowness of the Medicaid payments in 2016 and low Medicaid reimbursement rates resulted in two Planned Parenthood clinics in Colorado being closed in 2016. Since the start of the 2008 Colorado Family Planning Initiative, the number of abortions performed in the state fell by nearly half for women between the ages of 15–19. For women aged 20–24, the rate of abortions declined by 18%. For teens aged 15–19, the birth and abortion rate in Colorado between 2009 and 2014 declined around 50%. 9,453 legal abortions were performed in the state in 2014, with this number decreasing to 8,975 in 2015. 

There were abortion rights activities in Colorado in May 2019 as part of the #StoptheBans movement. The state has seen anti-abortion rights violence, including a death following a shooting at a Planned Parenthood clinic in Colorado Springs, Colorado, in November 2015.

In state politics, the Colorado Democratic Party largely support access to abortion while the Colorado Republican Party have embraced hardline anti-abortion stances which have included proposing laws to restrict or even ban abortion in the state.

History

Legislative history 
In 1962, the American Law Institute published their model penal code, as it applied to abortions, with three circumstances where they believed a physician could justifiably perform an abortion: "If ... there is substantial risk that the continuance of the pregnancy would gravely impair the physical or mental health of the mother, or that the child would be born with grave physical or mental defect, or that the pregnancy resulted from rape, incest, or other felonious intercourse." In 1967, Colorado became the first state to apply this into law. In the late 1960s, Arkansas, California, Colorado, Georgia, Maryland, New Mexico, North Carolina, and Oregon made reforms to their abortion laws, with most of these states providing more detailed medical guidance on when therapeutic abortions could be performed. In 1967, Colorado became the first state to decriminalize abortion in cases of rape, incest, or in which pregnancy would lead to permanent physical disability of the woman. In 1978, the state of Colorado had set aside Medicaid funding to provide poor women abortions if they needed one. The parents of Becky Bell worked against proposed parental notification laws in Colorado in 1998.

The Colorado Amendment 48 initiative was proposed in 2008 jointly by Kristine Burton and Michael Burton of Colorado for Equal Rights. Colorado Right to Life supported the amendment. There was bipartisan opposition. The text would have said, "Section 31. Person defined. AS USED IN SECTIONS 3, 6, AND 25 OF ARTICLE II OF THE STATE CONSTITUTION, THE TERMS "PERSON" OR "PERSONS" SHALL INCLUDE ANY HUMAN BEING FROM THE MOMENT OF FERTILIZATION." This definition would have applied to all sections of Colorado law, thus giving a fetus the equal rights of life, liberty, and property as a fully developed, born person would.

In 2013, the state was one of five where the legislature introduced a bill that would have banned abortion in almost all cases. It did not pass. This was repeated in 2014, where Colorado was one of three where the legislature unsuccessful tried to ban abortion. They repeated this in 2015, where the state was one of five. Again, this happened in 2016 where Colorado was one of four where the legislature introduced a bill that would have banned abortion in almost all cases. In 2017, the state was one of six trying to unsuccessfully banning abortion. The next year, Colorado was one of eleven where the legislature introduced a bill that would have banned abortion in almost all cases. It did not pass. In 2019, women in Colorado were eligible for temporary disability as a result of abortion or miscarriage.

During the 2022 legislative session, Colorado Republicans proposed several bills that aimed to restrict or even criminalize abortion in the state. The bills were ultimately blocked by Democrats, who hold a majority in the state legislature.

On April 4, 2022, Governor Jared Polis signed the Reproductive Health Equity Act, which guarantees access to reproductive care and affirms the rights of pregnant women to continue or terminate a pregnancy. The act prohibits public entities from restricting or denying those rights.

Judicial history 
The US Supreme Court's decision in 1973's Roe v. Wade ruling meant the state could no longer regulate abortion in the first trimester. However, the Supreme Court overturned Roe v. Wade in Dobbs v. Jackson Women's Health Organization,  later in 2022.

Ballot box history 
Colorado Amendment 48 was an initiative in 2008 to amend the definition of a person to "any human being from the moment of fertilization." On November 4, 2008, the initiative was turned down by 73.2 percent of the voters. Colorado Proposition 115 was a 2020 ballot initiative preventing abortion after 22 weeks unless the pregnancy endangered the mother's life. Performing an abortion after 22 weeks would have become a Class 1 misdemeanor. On November 3, 2020, Colorado voters rejected Proposition 115, with 59% of voters opposed to the initiative.

Clinic history 

Between 1982 and 1992, the number of abortion clinics in the state decreased by fourteen, going from 73 in 1982 to 59 in 1992. In 2014, there were 21 abortion clinics in the state. In 2014, 78% of the counties in the state did not have an abortion clinic. That year, 27% of women in the state aged 15 – 44 lived in a county without an abortion clinic.

In March 2016, there were 21 Planned Parenthood clinics in the state. After Planned Parenthood of the Rocky Mountains switched from directly billing women to directly billing Medicaid in 2016, they ran into funding bills as Medicaid has low reimbursement rates. Consequently, they were forced to close two clinics in Colorado and one in Wyoming in July 2017. In 2017, there were nineteen Planned Parenthood clinics, of which eleven offered abortion services, in a state with a population of 1,278,937 women aged 15–49.

Statistics 
In 1990, 426,000 women in the state faced the risk of an unintended pregnancy. Since the start of the 2008 Colorado Family Planning Initiative, the number of abortions performed in the state fell by nearly half for women between the ages of 15–19. For women aged 20–24, the rate of abortions declined by 18%. For teens aged 15–19, the birth and abortion rate in Colorado between 2009 and 2014 declined around 50%. For women aged 20–24, the abortion rate declined by 20%. In 2010, the state had no publicly funded abortions. In 2013, there were 700 abortions for white women aged 15–19, 110 abortions for black women aged 15–19, 470 abortions for Hispanic women aged 15–19, and 90 abortions for women of all other races.

In 2014, 59% of adults said in a poll by the Pew Research Center that abortion should be legal and 36% saying it should be illegal in all or most cases. In 2017, the state had an infant mortality rate of 4.5 deaths per 1,000 live births. From 2009 to 2017, the rate of teenage abortions in the state fell by 64%.

Contraceptive history 
In 2008, Colorado's Department of Public Health and Environment was provided with private funds to provide poor women in the state with long-acting reversible contraceptives (LARCs) at little or no cost to them. From 2009 to 2017, free, low-cost IUDs resulted in a 54% decline in the rate of teenage pregnancy in the state.

Deaths and injuries from unsafe or illegal abortions 
In the period between 1972 and 1974, there were zero recorded illegal abortion deaths in the state. During the winter of 1978, three women in less than a month required hospitalization in Denver after consuming pennyroyal oil for the purpose of trying to induce an abortion. One of these women died.

Abortion rights views and activities

Protests 
Women from the state participated in marches supporting abortion rights as part of a #StoptheBans movement in May 2019.

Anti-abortion views and activities

Protests 

Several hundred anti-abortion activists participate in the Rocky Mountain March for Life in Colorado each year to support ending abortion.

Respect Life Denver also organizes an annual rally and march in the state capitol each year to support legislation against abortion.

Violence 
An incident of anti-abortion violence occurred at an abortion clinic in Denver, Colorado on August 26, 2003.

Between 1993 and 2015, 11 people were killed at American abortion clinics. On November 29, 2015, a shooting at a Planned Parenthood clinic in Colorado Springs, Colorado, left three dead and several injured, and a suspect, Robert L. Dear, was apprehended. Police officer and pastor Garrett Swasey, US Iraq War veteran Ke'Arre M. Stewart, and Hawaiian Jennifer Markovsky, who was accompanying a friend at the clinic, were killed. The suspect had previously acted against other clinics, and referred to himself as a "warrior for the babies" at his hearing. Neighbors and former neighbors described the suspect as "reclusive", and police from several states where the suspect resided described a history of run-ins dating from at least 1997. On May 11, 2016, the court declared the suspect incompetent to stand trial after a mental evaluation was completed.

Footnotes

References 

Colorado
Healthcare in Colorado
Women in Colorado